Mur Pahn (also Romanized as Mūr Pahn) is a village in Dezhkord Rural District, Sedeh District, Eqlid County, Fars Province, Iran. At the 2006 census, its population was 266, in 48 families.

References 

Populated places in Eqlid County